The following are the Pulitzer Prizes for 1974.

Journalism awards

Public Service:
 Newsday, Garden City, New York, for its definitive report on the illicit narcotic traffic in the United States and abroad, entitled, The Heroin Trail.
Local General or Spot News Reporting:
 Arthur M. Petacque and Hugh F. Hough of the Chicago Sun-Times, for uncovering new evidence that led to the reopening of efforts to solve the 1966 murder of Valerie Percy.
Local Investigative Specialized Reporting:
 William Sherman of the New York Daily News, for his resourceful investigative reporting in the exposure of extreme abuse of the New York Medicaid program.
National Reporting:
 Jack White of The Providence Journal and Evening Bulletin, for his initiative in exclusively disclosing President Nixon's Federal income tax payments in 1970 and 1971.
National Reporting:
 James R. Polk of the Washington Star-News, for his disclosure of alleged irregularities in the financing of the campaign to re-elect President Nixon in 1972.
International Reporting:
 Hedrick Smith of The New York Times, for his coverage of the Soviet Union and its allies in Eastern Europe in 1973.
Commentary:
 Edwin A. Roberts Jr. of the National Observer, for his commentary on public affairs during 1973.
Criticism:
 Emily Genauer of Newsday Syndicate, for her critical writing about art and artists.
Editorial Writing:
 F. Gilman Spencer, editor of the Trentonian of Trenton, New Jersey, for his courageous campaign to focus public attention on scandals in New Jersey's state government.
Editorial Cartooning:
 Paul Szep of The Boston Globe, for his editorial cartooning during 1973.
Spot News Photography:
 Anthony K. Roberts, a free-lance photographer of Beverly Hills, California, for his picture series, Fatal Hollywood Drama, in which an alleged kidnapper was killed.

Feature Photography:
 Slava "Sal" Veder of Associated Press, for his picture Burst of Joy, which illustrated the return of an American prisoner of war from captivity in North Vietnam.

Letters, Drama and Music Awards

Fiction:
 No award given.
Drama:
 No award given.
History:
 The Americans: The Democratic Experience by Daniel J. Boorstin (Random)
Biography or Autobiography:
 O'Neill, Son and Artist by Louis Sheaffer (Little)
Poetry:
 The Dolphin by Robert Lowell (Farrar)
General Non-Fiction:
 The Denial of Death by Ernest Becker (Free Press/Macmillan)
Music:
 Notturno by Donald Martino (Ione Press)A chamber music piece commissioned by the Walter W. Naumburg Foundation and first performed May 15, 1973, at Alice Tully Hall, New York City, by Speculum Musicae.

Special Citations and Awards

Music:
Roger Sessions, a special citation to Roger Sessions for his life's work as a distinguished American composer.

External links
 

Pulitzer Prizes by year
Pulitzer Prize
Pulitzer